kW·h, kW h, and kWh are  abbreviations for kilowatt-hour, a unit of energy.

KWH may also refer to:

KWH Group, a Finnish company
Kachhwa Road railway station, Mirzapur district, Uttar Pradesh, India, station code KWH 
Kwai Hing station, Hong Kong, MTR station code KWH
Khwahan Airport, Badakhshan, Afghanistan, IATA code KWH
Kowiai language, ISO 639-3 language code kwh
Kiang Wu Hospital, in São Lázaro, Macau, China
KWH-TV, internet stream of Kelly Writers House, University of Pennsylvania, Philadelphia, U.S.